Ruben Enaje is a Filipino carpenter, sign painter, and former construction worker. He is noted for being crucified 33 times as of 2019.

He has been crucified every year from 1986 through 2019 on Good Friday; the COVID-19 pandemic required that he skip crucifixion in the years 2020–2022.

Background
Enaje, who was once a construction worker in the Philippines, fell down from an unfinished building in Tarlac, and unexpectedly survived. After the incident, saying that it was to thank the Lord for saving him, Enaje started participating in crucifixions, of his own free will, in a ritual done on Good Friday every year. Initially done only for nine years since the incident, he continued with his another set of nine years as a petition for the healing of his daughter from asthma and another nine years for the good health of his wife. His crucifixions have led to media coverage.

Timeline

1985
Enaje was crucified for his first time in 1985, during a reenactment of Jesus Christ of Nazareth's suffering.

2008
On March 21, 2008, Enaje, was nailed to a wooden cross on Good Friday for the 22nd time, in Pampanga, Philippines. 25 other penitents, including two women, were nailed on wooden crosses on Good Friday in San Pedro Cutud.

2010
Enaje was crucified again in his hometown, Pampanga, Philippines, this time for the 24th time, breaking his own record.

2011
Like the years before, Enaje had four-inch nails hammered into his palms and was hung on a cross for several minutes by local villagers dressed as Centurion.

2012
2012's crucifixion was the 26th one for Enaje.

2013
2013 was his possible final year in which he plans to be crucified, since he promised God that he would be crucified 27 times as a form of gratitude.

2016
Still without any permanent replacement, Enaje once again was crucified, along with 14 others in different places in Pampanga. He spent 11 minutes on the cross. Enaje offered his 30th straight crucifixion to the people of Belgium, who had recently suffered from a terrorist attack, and praying for a more peaceful outcome of the 2016 Philippine general election.

2018
For his 32nd straight year playing the role of Jesus Christ, Enaje was crucified again, together with three devotees who took part in this year's re-enactment of the death of Jesus Christ. He was not experiencing pain during the time when he was nailed to the cross.

2019
After being crucified once again in 2019, Enaje re-iterated his hopes to finally find a replacement, having now been crucified once a year for 33 years (the same number of years that Jesus was alive).

2023
Enaje said that he would have his 34th and final reenactment of the crucifixion in 2023. It would be his first since 2019 as it was halted from 2020 to 2022 due to the COVID-19 pandemic.

See also
Crucifixion in the Philippines

References

People from San Fernando, Pampanga
Carpenters
Living people
Year of birth missing (living people)
Crucifixion
Filipino Roman Catholics
21st-century Roman Catholics
Catholic penitential practices